Roland Tyrwhitt St John  (16 December 1914 – 3 October 1991) was Registrar of the Anglican Diocese of Brisbane from 1946 to 1974. The diocese comprised some 300 churches and covered an area of half a million square kilometers, reaching north to Bundaberg and south and west to the State borders. As its 'business manager' he restored its finances, improved its administration and guided it through a challenging period of expansion.  As a leading Anglican layman, his influence reached beyond the diocese to the wider Church.

Early life
Born at Boggabri NSW on 16 December 1914, 'Roley' was one of eight children of the Revd Canon Frederick de Port St John, a Church of England parish priest in rural NSW, and his wife Hannah Phoebe Mabel (Pyrke). Roland's uncle Revd Harold B St John was also a Church of England parish priest. Roland's younger brother was Edward St John QC MP.  Their grandfather Henry St John was a pioneer of Rawdon Island NSW and a nephew of Revd Ambrose St John, who converted to Roman Catholicism with his friend and colleague Cardinal John Henry Newman. Henry St John was a great-great-grandson of the 10th Baron St John of Bletso.

Educated at Armidale High School, Roland gained the degrees of BEc (Syd) and BA (Qld) by part-time studies and was an Associate of the Australian Society of Accountants. In accounting exams in 1952, he topped Australasia in Final Auditing with a mark of 94%. After working at Bank of NSW branches in several country towns he was transferred to the Bank's head office in Sydney. At the outbreak of war in 1939, he enlisted in the University Regiment. When the war extended to the Pacific in 1941 he volunteered for the 2nd AIF and served in Irian Jaya and New Britain, reaching the rank of Captain before returning to civilian life in 1946.

Career
At the age of 32 he was appointed by Archbishop Reginald Halse to be Diocesan Registrar, Brisbane, at a time when the diocese had been in a 'perilous financial position' for some years.  In his history of the Church of England in Queensland Dr. K Rayner wrote:
A member of a well-known New South Wales clerical family, St John brought to his new position both a thorough knowledge of church affairs and also the financial and administrative ability of rare quality. He recognised what many businessmen on church committees had not realised, that even in its business affairs the church could not always use the same methods as commercial enterprises, because its aims were different.
"We must remember that the Church is a Church and not a business. In the long run, its success – as a Church – will depend on its spiritual strength, rather than its financial resources. If the first is healthy, there will be little difficulty about the latter." 
This implied no mandate for inefficiency in managing church affairs, and the announcement in 1956 of the complete elimination of the deficiency accounts of the diocese, which had totalled more than £40,000 in 1946, was a remarkable demonstration of the skillful handling of the financial affairs of the church by the registrar.

'Personality of the Diocese' 
The Church Chronicle in 1958 reported him as 'Personality of the Diocese': 
Do our people realise the colossal job that the Registrar of the Diocese is doing?  Mr. St John is always available to help Clergy and laypeople in their problems connected with the Diocese.  He is Secretary of the Diocesan Council, where his knowledge and help are invaluable. The Registrar attends each meeting of the Councils and Advisory bodies of Church Schools and Institutions.  He is without fear or favour.  We cannot but record a mere fraction of his activities, and they are always carried out with good sense, good humour, and accurate knowledge.  The Registrar also has acted as Secretary of this journal, and with his loyal staff does more than most of us realise to help forward the work of the Diocese.

Building program
Combining his financial acumen and his strong sense of vocation he also helped initiate the diocese's ambitious building program, which included expansion of diocesan schools, rebuilding existing hostels for the aged, and building new hostels.  One of these, Spiritus Symes Thorpe, an extensive facility for the aged at Toowoomba, was opened in 1961 as an outcome of his extensive negotiations with a major benefactor.

The Diocese had long wanted to extend St John's Cathedral and knew that this would be an enormous undertaking.  With the Diocese's improved financial position, the 2nd stage of cathedral construction began in 1965 and was completed in 1968.  St John was actively involved in fund-raising for the construction and in its design and project management.

He was also involved in the 1960s' controversy about St Martin's Hospital, in Cathedral Square, which the Church proposed to replace with a new hospital at Zillmere.  The proposal was stayed by the 'Save St Martin's' movement and went to litigation.  In 1975 the Supreme Court upheld the Church's decision to move the hospital.  Archbishop Felix Arnott said: 'This was a very satisfactory conclusion, and was a great tribute to the efforts of our lawyers and Mr. R T St John, who was largely responsible for preparing the material'.  The old building is now a church office.

'Tireless church worker'
An active lay churchman, he contributed to the establishment of the Constitution of the Anglican Church of Australia (1962); represented the diocese at the Toronto Anglican Congress (1963); and was a member of the Anglican Consultative Council.  As a 'tireless church worker' he was a member of the General Synod of the Church of England in Australia 1950-74 (and its standing committee and finance committee and the long service leave board) and a member of the Anglican Consultative Council of the whole of Anglican Community 1970-73.
He also held numerous community positions; among them, he was secretary of The Southport School Council and the Anglican Church Grammar School Council 1947-74; member of the National Council of Independent Schools of Australia 1970-73; secretary of the District Nursing Association of Brisbane 1966-74; and Lt, Capt (Education Officer) CMF 1955-65.

Archbishop Halse died in 1962 and was succeeded by the conservative Philip Strong. Tension arose between St John and Strong, as recorded by historian Dr. J C Holland: 'The Diocese had a powerful Registrar, Roland St John, and he and other outspoken leaders did not always see eye to eye with the archbishop...The resultant tension further decreased the capacity of the Diocese to respond adequately to social change and numerical decline.'

An example of their different attitudes concerned gambling. In 1965 the Diocesan Synod considered a motion to reaffirm its traditional ban on art unions, raffles, lotteries, and games of chance to raise funds for the Church. Archbishop Strong lent weighty support to the motion, stating clearly that the real sin is in gambling. A vigorous debate followed and the motion was passed only with an amendment moved by St John that gambling is not necessarily wrong in itself. In 1970 the Synod again considered whether to lift the Diocesan ban on gambling. In his Synod sermon - his last before retirement - Strong once more made his position clear but support was not overwhelming. Strong was astonished when St John, to resolve the matter, moved that the 1965 resolution be rescinded. St John argued that he opposed gambling to raise funds in parish churches but, given the divided opinion, there could no longer be a ruling against this. Strong was distressed when the 1965 resolution was rescinded.

Never afraid of debate, St John protested in 1965 against Sir Raphael Cilento's intemperate comments about 'brain-washed bishops' who had urged negotiation in the Vietnam War and de-criminalisation of homosexuality.(A year later Cilento was obstructing the pre-selection of Roland's brother Edward St John QC to be the Liberal Party candidate for Warringah, Sydney, in the imminent federal elections.)

In 1968 Roland was awarded an MBE for his services to the Church and the community.

He retired at the end of 1974. The Brisbane Diocesan Newsletter reported: 
When Mr. Roland St John walks away from Church House on December 31st this year, he will have completed 28 years as Diocesan Registrar. His shock resignation for health reasons marks the close of a remarkable and distinguished church career...Unquestionably he has been regarded as one of the leading lay members of the Australian Church, in which he made his presence felt at all levels from General Synod to parish activity. The recognition of his important place in the General Synod came with his election as the first Australian lay member of the Anglican Consultative Council.  He made significant contributions in its debates at Limuru (1971) and Dublin (1973). At this level of international church diplomacy, Roland St John was at his best… Observers have often been surprised by the speeches of the quietly-spoken man who at first sight seems likely to be a conservative.  His radical thinking on issues such as racism, war, violence and the position of women in the church have won the admiration and gratitude of many.

Assessment
In his history of the Church of England in Brisbane, Dr J C Holland wrote of St John:
His 28 years as registrar show how a layman could come to exercise diocesan influence as great as that of any diocesan bishop. ...He was universally respected and even admired, rather than loved. His encyclopedic knowledge of both Diocesan organisations and intimate parish details, together with a reputation for having brought the Diocese back from serious debt, gave him credibility, stature and the voice of authority, as well as the capacity to use his knowledge to further the policies which he believed were right... Halse had come to rely on him immensely and trusted his judgement...and was happy to refer difficult situations to him, and not only of a financial or administrative kind. 
His reports on serious and potentially contentious matters ...show a mind capable of great clarity about the issues. 
When [Archbishop] Strong arrived [1962] there were differences of opinion over policy and style. ...Whereas Strong leant on the Holy Spirit, St John was more pragmatic and politically nuanced....The tension between Strong and St John was never satisfactorily resolved...At times, Strong recognised the great ability that St John had. He praised as 'outstanding and remarkable' an address that St John gave to Diocesan Synod in June 1967... No doubt St John too recognised the great ability that Strong had and his spiritual integrity, and publicly they put forward, as much as possible, a united front.

Yet nothing could take away the enormous contribution [St John] made to the diocese over 28 years.  He had knowledge of every department of diocesan life. He carefully and thoroughly stewarded the diocesan finances. ...He readily listened to troubled clergy and he offered leadership to the wider Australian Anglican church. He had a zeal to see the work of the church in the Diocese of Brisbane's progress and expand.  At St John’s last diocesan synod, [Archbishop] Arnott spoke of his selfless devotion to the diocese and...it will be for his selfless devotion to his Lord and his Church that he will be principally remembered.

Personal life
Roland married Margaret, daughter of Archdeacon Reginald Massey, in 1949.  They had a happy family life with their five children: David, Paul, Philippa, Nigel, and Julian.  Margaret's early death in 1972 after a long illness was a deep grief to him.  At a time when his work responsibilities were at their height, he became a single parent.  In 1976 he married a widow with children, Marjorie Richardson (1924-2008).

St John's Cathedral dedicated a stained-glass window to Roland and Margaret in 1976.  (St Alban's Anglican Church, Quirindi NSW, has stained-glass windows dedicated to Roland's parents.)

On retiring as Registrar he took up an administrative position with a firm run by a family he had known from the church.  In 1981, after he had retired entirely, he and Marjorie moved to Toowoomba. He read history, appreciated the arts, and loved music. He collected oriental ceramics and china though he had little money to spend on them. In his latter years, he painted in watercolour.

In his book of memoirs Memories at Sunset he wrote of his childhood in Uralla and recounted anecdotes about people he had met during his lifetime.  But they were not an autobiography: 'They do not speak of my good fortune in having godly, impressive and understanding parents…Nor do they refer to my marriage to two wonderful women…They do not mention the many joys and occasional sorrows of bringing up a large family'.  These remained personal matters.

Death and tributes
He died on 3 October 1991 aged nearly 77.  In a tribute, the Primate of Australia, Dr Keith Rayner, said: "The Diocese of Brisbane and the whole Australian Church owed a tremendous amount to Roland's dedicated service and the acumen with which it was carried out. When he became Registrar he inherited a very difficult administrative and financial situation in Brisbane and he achieved a remarkable amount in turning this around."The Toowoomba Chronicle published an obituary "'Tireless church worker' dies at 76".

The Thanksgiving Eucharist was at All Saints' Church, Toowoomba.  Bishop Adrian Charles spoke of Roland's meticulous attention to detail, which was of such value when the Church Canons (laws) of the Diocese were being produced; and his great work and influence beyond the Diocese in the national General Synod and in production of the constitution of the Anglican Church in Australia and the Church's prayer book.  He also spoke of Roland's genuine love for things in the country and said that Roland felt that meeting country people made the difficulties of the Registrar's job seem worthwhile.

The General Synod's Standing Committee formally recorded the following minute on 24/25 October 1991:
That this Standing Committee record its thankfulness to Almighty God for the life service and witness of Roland Tyrwhitt St John, formerly Registrar of the Diocese of Brisbane from 1946 to 1974, member of the General Synod from 1950 to 1974, and the Standing Committee, its Finance Committee and the Long Service Leave Board; for his representation of the Anglican Church of Australia at the Toronto Congress and the Anglican Consultative Council at Limuru and Dublin; for his outstanding work in re-establishing the financial stability of the Diocese of Brisbane; for his contribution to the establishment of the Constitution of this Church and the Long Service Leave Fund and his vigorous contribution to its debates on a wide range of subjects; and convey to his widow Marjorie and their children their sympathy and assurance of their prayers for them at this time.

Notes

References

1914 births
1991 deaths
Anglican Diocese of Brisbane
Anglican Church of Australia Ecclesiastical Province of Queensland
Anglican Church of Australia